Patrick Machreich (born 29 September 1980) is an Austrian former professional ice hockey goaltender.

Machreich began his career with his hometown team EK Zell am See in 1997.  He played a total of five seasons in the Austrian Hockey League before they were relegated to the Nationalliga in 2002.  He played one season in the league before moving to Finland, playing eleven games for Ahmat Hyvinkää in the Finnish Mestis.

He returned to Austria in 2003, signing for the Graz 99ers where he spent two seasons.  After one season with VSV EC, he signed for EHC Black Wings Linz in 2006. After two seasons with Linz, Macherich opted to return to the Nationalliga with EHC Lustenau. Machreich made a return to the top level EBEL, in signing and playing for three seasons with HC TWK Innsbruck.

Machreich has also represented Austria in the Ice Hockey World Championships in 2005 and 2007.  He also played in the World Junior Championship in 2000.

References

External links

1980 births
Austrian ice hockey goaltenders
VEU Feldkirch players
Graz 99ers players
HC TWK Innsbruck players
Living people
EHC Black Wings Linz players
EHC Lustenau players
Mestis players
EC VSV players
EK Zell am See players
People from Zell am See
Sportspeople from Salzburg (state)